Gerd Böckmann (born 11 January 1944 in Chemnitz, Germany) is a German television actor.

Selected filmography

Television
 The Unguarded House (1975, TV film)
 Derrick - Season 2, Episode 10: "Kamillas junger Freund" (1975, TV)
 Derrick - Season 4, Episode 6: "Das Kuckucksei" (1977, TV)
 The Buddenbrooks (1979, TV series)
 Derrick - Season 10, Episode 8: "Attentat auf Derrick" (1983, TV)
 The Wannsee Conference (1984, TV film), as Adolf Eichmann
 Derrick - Season 12, Episode 4: "Toter Goldfisch" (1985, TV)
 Der Mann ohne Schatten (1996, TV series)

Film
 The Standard (1977)
 Adventure (2011)

References

External links

Divina Agency Vienna 

1944 births
Living people
German male television actors
People from Chemnitz
German male film actors